Challuru Prathyusha (born 25 July 1998) is an Indian cricketer. In February 2021, Prathyusha earned her maiden call-up to the India women's cricket team, for their limited overs matches against South Africa. She made her Women's One Day International (WODI) debut for India, against South Africa, on 17 March 2021.

References

1998 births
Living people
Indian women cricketers
India women One Day International cricketers
Place of birth missing (living people)